ASVARAN (officially blend word for "Asb Savaran", Hoursemounters; the word Asvaran itself also means Cavalries) is the mounted police unit of Law Enforcement Command of Islamic Republic of Iran and a subdivision of its Special Units Command. The unit specializes in crowd control and riot control.

See also
Aswaran, cavalry unit in the Sassanian army

References

Special forces of Iran
Law Enforcement Command of Islamic Republic of Iran
Mounted police